Bernard Vajdič, (born September 18, 1980 in  Celje), is a Slovenian alpine skier.

Vajdič represented Slovenia at the 2006 and 2010 Winter Olympics. He specializes in the slalom discipline of his sport, but he also competes in giant slalom. 

Bernard Vajdič currently resides in Ljubljana, Slovenia.

References 

1980 births
Living people
Slovenian male alpine skiers
Alpine skiers at the 2006 Winter Olympics
Alpine skiers at the 2010 Winter Olympics
Olympic alpine skiers of Slovenia
Sportspeople from Celje
Universiade medalists in alpine skiing
Universiade gold medalists for Slovenia
Universiade bronze medalists for Slovenia
Competitors at the 2001 Winter Universiade